is a single-member electoral district for the House of Representatives, the lower house of the National Diet of Japan. It is located in the prefecture (-dō) of Hokkaidō and consists of  Hokkaido's Kamikawa Subprefecture.

The CDP lost the seat in the 2021 elections by large margins. The CDP candidate was Masahito Nishikawa the former mayor of Asahikawa, by far the biggest city in the constituency. After the death of a young girl caused by bullying and the city being badly affected by the COVID-19 pandemic Nishikawa's decision to go into national politics faced heavy criticism and he was seen as avoiding responsibility.

List of representatives

Recent results

References 

Politics of Hokkaido
Districts of the House of Representatives (Japan)